No Matter How Far is a compilation album by American singer David Archuleta. It is composed of ten tracks which feature a mix of previously unreleased U.S. songs and new material like "Don't Run Away" and "Heart Falls Out". Its lead single, "Don't Run Away", was released on February 12, 2013.

Information 
The album was released on March 26, 2013, under the license of Entertainment One. It consists of one U.S. unreleased song titled "Nothing Else Better to Do", seven compiled songs from previous albums' The Other Side of Down: Asian Tour Edition and Philippines' exclusive release Forevermore and two new songs: "Don't Run Away" and "Heart Falls Out". On March 22, 2013, the website Billboard released an exclusive preview of the full album. A music video for its carrier song "Don't Run Away" created by the artist Kylie Malchus was released on March 25.

Track listing

Reception 
The album debuted at No. 110 on Billboard 200 chart.

Charts

References 

2013 compilation albums
David Archuleta albums